Trombley is a surname. Notable people with the surname include:

 Laura Skandera Trombley (21st century), fifth president of Pitzer College
 Mike Trombley (born 1967), American baseball player
 Rosalie Trombley (1939–2021), Canadian music director
 Stephen Trombley (born 1954), American author, musician, and filmmaker

See also
 Trombley, Ohio